"Don't Know What to Do" is a song recorded by South Korean girl group Blackpink. It was written by Brian Lee and Teddy Park, who is also the producer of the song alongside 24, Bekuh Boom, and R.Tee. It is the second track on the group's second EP, Kill This Love.

Promotion
Blackpink promoted the song on several music programs in South Korea including Inkigayo. It was also promoted at Coachella Valley Music and Arts Festival in April 2019.

Commercial performance
In South Korea, the song debuted at number 121 on the Gaon Digital Chart, later peaking at 38. In Japan, it debuted at number 49 on the Japan Hot 100.

Charts

Weekly charts

Monthly charts

Release history

References

2019 songs
Blackpink songs
Songs written by Brian Lee (songwriter)
Songs written by Teddy Park